Benton McMillin (September 11, 1845 – January 8, 1933) was an American politician and diplomat.  He served as the 27th governor of Tennessee from 1899 to 1903, and represented Tennessee's 4th district in the United States House of Representatives from 1879 to 1899.  He served as a diplomat during the administration of President Woodrow Wilson, initially as Minister to Peru (1913–1919), and afterward as Minister to Guatemala (1920–1921).

Known as the "Democratic War Horse" for his persistent campaigning on behalf of the Democratic Party, McMillin served as an elector in fourteen presidential elections from 1876 to 1932, and attended nearly every Democratic National Convention during this period.  As governor, he signed anti-child labor legislation and standardized the state's school textbooks.  His attempts to create a federal income tax as a congressman led to the landmark Supreme Court decision, Pollock v. Farmers' Loan & Trust Co. (1895), which declared federal income taxes unconstitutional.

Early life

McMillin was born in Monroe County, Kentucky, the son of John McMillin, a wealthy planter, and Elizabeth (Black) McMillin.  He attended Philomath Academy in Clay County, Tennessee, and later attended Kentucky A&M (now the University of Kentucky) in Lexington. During the Civil War, McMillin supported the Confederacy, and wanted to join the Confederate Army, but was unable to obtain his father's permission.  At one point, he was captured by Union forces and briefly jailed for refusing to take the Oath of Allegiance.

After the war, McMillin studied law with Judge E. L. Gardenshire in Carthage, Tennessee.  He was admitted to the bar in 1871, and began practicing in Celina, Tennessee.  In 1874, he was elected to the Tennessee House of Representatives.  The following year, he was appointed by Governor James D. Porter to negotiate a territorial purchase from Kentucky.  In 1877, following his term in the state legislature, he was appointed special judge of the state's Fifth Judicial District by Governor Porter.

In 1878, McMillin was elected to the first of ten consecutive terms in the U.S. House of Representatives, defeating 4th District incumbent Haywood Y. Riddle.  Throughout his 20-year tenure, McMillin opposed excess government spending, tariffs, and most of the nation's global exploits, which he deemed imperialistic.  He also opposed the Lodge Bill of 1890, which would have provided protections for black voters in the South.  McMillin supported antitrust legislation and currency expansion. As a member of the House Rules Committee in the 1890s, he frequently challenged Speaker of the House Thomas B. Reed.

In 1894, McMillin attached an amendment to the Wilson–Gorman Tariff Act that would have established a federal income tax.  The law was challenged in federal court, however, and in 1895, the Supreme Court ruled federal income taxes unconstitutional when it issued its decision in Pollock v. Farmers' Loan & Trust Co.  McMillin continued campaigning in favor of federal income taxes until the adoption of the 16th Amendment, which gave the federal government the power to collect income taxes, in 1913.

Governor

In 1897, McMillin sought the U.S. Senate seat left vacant by the death of Isham G. Harris. Failing to garner any support, he then sought and successfully obtained the Democratic nomination for governor the following year in the race to succeed popular governor Robert Love Taylor.  McMillin won by a large margin on election day, with 105,640 votes to 72,611 for the Republican candidate James Alexander Fowler, 2,428 for Populist candidate W.D. Turley, and 1,722 for Prohibition candidate R.N. Richardson.

By the time McMillin ran for reelection in 1900, the state's Republican Party had come under the control of Congressman Walter P. Brownlow.  Seeking to unseat McMillin, Brownlow and his faction nominated Congressman John E. McCall as the party's candidate for governor.  While the party ran a strong campaign, McMillin was easily reelected, winning 145,708 votes to 119,831 for McCall.

During his two terms, McMillin implemented a number of progressive measures.  He signed legislation authorizing counties to establish high schools and school boards, and instituted a property tax to pay for school textbooks.  In 1901, he signed legislation aimed at reducing child labor by increasing the state's minimum age for employment from 12 to 14.  He also finalized the state's boundary with Virginia, and set up a sinking fund to reduce the state debt.

Later life

After his second term as governor ended in 1903, McMillin established an insurance business in Nashville.  He remained active in Democratic Party politics, however, serving as an elector in every presidential election between 1876 and 1932, with the exception of the 1916 election, and attending every Democratic National Convention during the same period, with the exception of the 1920 convention.

In 1912, a divided Democratic Party nominated McMillin as the party's candidate for governor in hopes of unseating Republican Ben W. Hooper.  The party was divided over the prohibition issue, with one faction, the "Independent Democrats" (who supported statewide prohibition), having withdrawn from the party and formed a coalition (the "Fusionists") with Republicans.  McMillin represented the other faction, the "Regular Democrats," who believed the state's largest cities should be exempt from prohibition.  He was defeated in the general election, winning just 116,610 votes to Hooper's 124,641.  One factor in the electoral loss may well have been the death of McMillin's only son in Bristol, Tennessee, who took ill at the end of October.  When the doctors lost hope, candidate McMillin and his wife stayed at his son's bedside for nearly a week, cancelling all engagements.

In 1913, President Woodrow Wilson appointed McMillin Envoy Extraordinary and Minister Plenipotentiary to Peru.  Shortly after arriving in the Peruvian capital, Lima, he helped negotiate an "Advancement of Peace" that formalized relations between the two countries.

In 1919, McMillin was appointed Minister to Guatemala.  A few months after his arrival, a revolt erupted against unpopular president Manuel Estrada Cabrera, with Cabrera eventually surrendering to McMillin to avoid capture by supporters of Carlos Herrera.  The American embassy was damaged during Herrera's five-day bombardment of the capital.  Herrera would also be deposed in a coup before the end of McMillin's tenure.

Upon returning to Tennessee, McMillin again sought his party's nomination for governor.  His chief opponent was Clarksville farmer and public education advocate Austin Peay.  Although the 77-year-old McMillin campaigned vigorously, Peay had the support of rising political boss E. H. Crump, and edged McMillin for the nomination, 63,940 votes to 59,922.

After his defeat in the 1922 campaign, McMillin returned to his insurance business.  He died in Nashville on January 8, 1933, and is buried in the city's Mount Olivet Cemetery.

Family and influence

McMillin married Marie Childress Brown, the daughter of Governor John C. Brown, in 1886.  They had a son, John Brown McMillin (1887-1912) before she died the following year.  In 1897, McMillin married Lucille Foster, a noted women's suffragist and president of the Tennessee Federation of Women's Clubs.  She served as a civil service commissioner under President Franklin D. Roosevelt in the 1940s.  She and McMillin had one daughter, Ellinor Foster McMillin Oliver (1898-1919).

McMillin's brother, Joseph, was a teacher at the Montvale Academy in Celina.  One of his students was future Secretary of State Cordell Hull.  Hull later recalled Benton McMillin as one of his political mentors.

See also
List of governors of Tennessee

References

External links

Benton McMillin Papers (finding aid) – Tennessee State Library and Archives

1845 births
1933 deaths
People from Monroe County, Kentucky
Democratic Party governors of Tennessee
Ambassadors of the United States to Peru
Ambassadors of the United States to Guatemala
Democratic Party members of the United States House of Representatives from Tennessee
Burials at Mount Olivet Cemetery (Nashville)
19th-century American politicians
20th-century American politicians
20th-century American diplomats